Parvati Kumari is an Indian classical singer. She is popular for her sufi music.

Early life
Parvati Kumari did her Sangeet Visharad from Gandharva Mahavidyalay and a BA in music from Delhi University.
Done graduation in Music from Delhi university.

Career
Parvati Kumari was discovered by Saregama India. She released her debut album Barse Barse Naina.

References

Performers of Sufi music
Living people
Year of birth missing (living people)
Indian women ghazal singers
Indian ghazal singers